Daegeumsan may refer to:
 Daegeumsan (South Gyeongsang), Geoje, Gyeongsangnam-do, South Korea.
 Daegeumsan (Gyeonggi), Gapyeong, Gyeonggi-do.